Robyn Field-Jones (born 27 June 1966) is a former professional tennis player from South Africa. She lives in Durban.

Field played American collegiate tennis for the Texas Longhorns of the University of Texas during the 1980s.

From 1988 to 1991, Field competed on the professional tour. She qualified for the main draw of the 1990 Wimbledon Championships, with wins over Carling Bassett-Seguso, Yayuk Basuki and Renata Baranski, before falling in the first round to Tami Whitlinger. As a doubles player she also featured in the main draws of the French Open and US Open.

ITF finals

Singles: 4 (1-3)

Doubles: 18 (12–6)

References

External links
 
 

1966 births
Living people
South African female tennis players
Texas Longhorns women's tennis players
Sportspeople from Durban
White South African people